Jorle Estrada (born 3 April 1989) is a Colombian minimumweight boxer.  Estrada lost to Merlito Sabillo for the WBO minimumweight title.  Estrada has also fought Carlos Velarde, Carlos Buitrago and Alexis Díaz.

References

External links

1989 births
Living people
Mini-flyweight boxers
Colombian male boxers